Turkey sent eight athletes, among to the 2002 European Athletics Championships held between August 6 and August 11, 2002 in Munich, Germany. The only medal-winning Turkish athlete was Süreyya Ayhan competing in the 1,500 m event.

Results

Nations at the 2002 European Athletics Championships
European Athletics Championships
2002